Chen Li-Ju (born 24 April 1981) is an athlete from the Republic of China.  She competes in archery.

Chen represented the Republic of China (as Chinese Taipei) at the 2004 Summer Olympics.  She placed 45th in the women's individual ranking round with a 72-arrow score of 617.  In the first round of elimination, she faced 20th-ranked Sumangala Sharma of India.  Chen lost 142-133 in the 18-arrow match, placing 50th overall in women's individual archery.

Chen was also a member of the team that won the bronze medal for Chinese Taipei in the women's team archery competition.

References

 

1981 births
Living people
Archers at the 2004 Summer Olympics
Olympic archers of Taiwan
Olympic bronze medalists for Taiwan
Olympic medalists in archery
Medalists at the 2004 Summer Olympics
Asian Games medalists in archery
Archers at the 2014 Asian Games
Archers at the 2018 Asian Games
Taiwanese female archers
Asian Games silver medalists for Chinese Taipei
Asian Games bronze medalists for Chinese Taipei
Universiade medalists in archery
Medalists at the 2014 Asian Games
Medalists at the 2018 Asian Games
Universiade gold medalists for Chinese Taipei
21st-century Taiwanese women